Pascal Köpke (born 3 September 1995) is a German professional footballer who plays as a forward for 1. FC Nürnberg. He is the son of former German international goalkeeper Andreas Köpke.

Club career
Köpke spent ten years in 1. FC Nürnberg's youth team, before joining SpVgg Unterhaching in July 2013. Four months later he made his debut for the club as a substitute for Marius Duhnke in a 3. Liga match against VfB Stuttgart II, scoring the fourth goal in a 4–0 win. The goal - an overhead kick - was voted as goal of the month for November 2013.

In June 2018, Hertha BSC announced Köpke would join for the 2018–19 season, reportedly signing a four-year contract until 2022, after previously having been on the verge of a move to Hannover 96.

On 29 August 2020, Köpke returned to 1. FC Nürnberg.

Career statistics

References

External links

Pascal Köpke at Kicker

1995 births
Living people
Sportspeople from Hanau
Association football forwards
German footballers
SpVgg Unterhaching players
SpVgg Unterhaching II players
Karlsruher SC players
FC Erzgebirge Aue players
Hertha BSC players
Hertha BSC II players
1. FC Nürnberg players
Bundesliga players
2. Bundesliga players
3. Liga players
Regionalliga players
Germany youth international footballers
Footballers from Hesse